James Bain may refer to:

 Sir James Bain (Whitehaven MP) (1817–1898), Lord Provost of Glasgow, MP for Whitehaven 1891–2, founder of Whitehaven Ironworks
 James Bain (minister) (1828–1911), Scottish minister
 James Bain (librarian) (1842–1908), Scottish-Canadian bookseller, publisher, and librarian
 James Bain (footballer) (1878–?), Scottish footballer (Manchester United)
 James Bain (innocent prisoner) (born 1955), Florida, freed from prison after 35 years after DNA tests showed innocence
 James Keith Bain (born 1929), Australian businessman
 James Thompson Bain (1860–1919), socialist and syndicalist in colonial South Africa
 James Tocher Bain (1906–1988), Canadian engineer
 James Walker Bain (1841–1899), New Zealand politician
 James William Bain (1838–1909), Canadian politician and merchant
 James Bain (Egremont MP) (1851–1913), British Member of Parliament for Egremont, 1900–1906
 James Watson Bain, Canadian chemist

See also 
 Jamie Bain (born 1991), Scottish footballer (Airdrieonians)
 Jimmy Bain (1947–2016), Scottish bassist
 Jimmy Bain (footballer, born 1899) (1899–1969), Scottish footballer (Brentford)
 Jimmy Bain (footballer, born 1919) (1919–2002), Scottish footballer (Swindon Town)
 James Baine (1710–1790), minister of the Church of Scotland
 James Baines (disambiguation)